Paris By Night 84: In Atlanta - Passport to Music & Fashion is a Paris By Night program that was filmed at the Atlanta Civic Center on Sunday, July 2, 2006 and is released to a 2-disc DVD format on Thursday, December 7, 2006; with many places getting it on Wednesday, December 6, 2006. This program is dedicated to Vietnamese designers and fashion artists. It includes several fashion shows and runway presentations by selected designers, such as Chloe Dao, winner of the Project Runway show. It also includes small-parted skits made by the MCs of the show, Nguyễn Ngọc Ngạn and Nguyễn Cao Kỳ Duyên, and regular comedian actress, Kieu Oanh. It is billed by Thúy Nga as The Most Magnificent and Extravagant Show of the Year.

Some have debated to whether Paris By Night 84 is a direct continuation of Paris By Night 57: Thời Trang và Âm Nhạc, released at the end of 2000, and is also dedicated to the fashion arts and music. The poke is that "" (Music) and "" (Fashion) has been switched around in the two titles. Some codenamed it, as a direct continuation of Paris By Night 57: . However, once the filming has begun, viewers now know it as In Atlanta - Passport to Music & Fashion. Even though the two Paris By Night's are the same in dedication and program, the two titles remained different in choosing of switching around the titles, and adding an English alternative to the Paris By Night 84 title. Paris By Night 84 is now viewed as an indirect successor to Paris By Night 57: .

Track list

Paris by Night

vi:Paris By Night 84